Prądnik (also called Białucha in its lower course) is a river in Poland, running through the Kraków-Częstochowa Upland in Poland's Lesser Poland voivodeship. The river is a left tributary of Vistula. The source of the river lies in the village of Sułoszowa in the Olkusz Uplands. It flows in a deep gully through the Ojców National Park. The lower run in Kraków has been designated an ecological reserve on 17 December 2008. Until 1655, when Vistula changed its course in the vicinity of Kraków, Prądnik joined Vistula's old riverbed near what is now Blich Street. However, in modern times the lower run of the river is regulated and empties itself into the Vistula in the Kraków's borough of Dąbie.

Apart from the official names, the river is variously known as Prątnik, Promnik, Sałaszówka or Sułoszówka.

Prądnik passes through several towns and villages, giving names to some of them. The list includes Sułoszowa, Pieskowa Skała, Ojców, Prądnik Korzkiewski, Giebułtów, Januszowice, Pękowice and Zielonki, as well as Kraków's boroughs of Prądnik Biały, Prądnik Czerwony, Stare Miasto and Grzegórzki. The stream Sąspówka is a right tributary.

See also
Prądnik bread

Rivers of Poland
Rivers of Lesser Poland Voivodeship